More, More, More is the first studio album by the group Andrea True Connection, released in 1976 by Buddah Records. It spawned the title song which became a hit in the charts. The album peaked at #47 on the Billboard sales chart in the U.S. and received favourable reviews.

Background and production
During her heyday as a porn actress, around 1975, True was hired by a real estate business in Jamaica to appear in their commercials. While she was working there, the Jamaican government banned asset transfers in response to sanctions imposed by the U.S. after the election of Michael Manley, a supporter of Fidel Castro. In order to return to the U.S., True would have either to forfeit her pay or spend the money before she went home. True, who by this time was trying to break into the music industry, chose to invest the money in recording a demo of "More, More, More", a song she had been working on with record producer Gregg Diamond, her partner in a project called The Andrea True Connection. Remixed by recording engineer Tom Moulton, "More, More, More" became a favorite in nightclubs. Diamond then wrote and produced four other tracks which for Andrea's debut album, arranged in a disco style.

Singles
The album's first single, "More, More, More", released at the turn of 1975 and 1976, went on to become a major hit, reaching #4 on the Billboard Hot 100 and #2 on the Dance Music/Club Play chart in the U.S. It also peaked at #1 in Canada and #5 in the UK. "Party Line" was released later in 1976 to a minor chart success in the U.S. and Canada, reaching #80 and #90 in the national charts, respectively.

Critical reception

The album was described as a "strong disco set" which sounds "funky and professional" in a Billboard magazine review, which also noted Diamond's "[g]ood arrangements" and True's "better than average voice". 

Robert Christgau gave the album a B and wrote that "even if you haven't seen her movies, she projects an exhibitionistic suck-and-fuck tractability that links the two pervasive fantasy media of our time, and from such conjunctions Great Art arises." 

Stephen Cook from the AllMusic website gave the album three out of five stars and wrote that "the Andrea True Connection's debut is a classic bit of polished dancefloor kitsch", and "a classic from the disco catalog" that "makes good on its one giant hit with a highly enjoyable and urbane array of dance tracks."

Track listing
All tracks written by Gregg Diamond.

Charts

References

External links
 Official audio on YouTube
 Andrea True Connection at Discogs

1976 debut albums
Andrea True albums
Buddah Records albums